The 7th Bangladesh National Film Awards, presented by Ministry of Information, Bangladesh to felicitate the best of Bangladeshi Cinema released in the year 1982. Bangladesh National Film Awards is a film award ceremony in Bangladesh established in 1975 by Government of Bangladesh.  Every year, a national panel appointed by the government selects the winning entry, and the award ceremony is held in Dhaka. 1982 was the 7th ceremony of National Film Awards.

List of winners
This year awards were given in 15 categories and awards for Best Film and Best Art Director were not given.

Merit awards

Technical awards

Summary
Boro Bhalo Lok Chhilo won 6 awards: Best Director, Best Actor, Best Actor in a Supporting Role, Best Music Director, Best Male Playback Singer and Best Dialogue. Shabana received the best actress award.

See also
 Meril Prothom Alo Awards
 Ifad Film Club Award
 Babisas Award

References

External links

National Film Awards (Bangladesh) ceremonies
Bangladesh National Film Awards
1982 awards in Bangladesh
Bangladesh National Film Awards
National Film Awards